John Henry Cobbina, known as J. H. Cobbina, is a former Ghanaian police office and was the Inspector General of Police of the Ghana Police Service from 13 January 1972 to 29 September 1974. 

Cobbina was born to John Henry Cobbina (Senior) from Sekondi, after whom he was named. He became the first Police Regional Commander for the Brong-Ahafo Region on 23 September 1958.

Following the coup d'état of 13 January 1972 which overthrew the Progress Party government of Kofi Abrefa Busia, Cobbina as the Inspector General of Police was appointed the Commissioner for Interior and a member of the National Redemption Council.

Honours
The street on which the Central Police Station is located at Takoradi is named after him.

References

Possibly living people
Ghanaian police officers
Ghanaian Inspector Generals of Police
Year of birth missing